Galleon was a French house group from Marseille, founded by Michel Fages and Phillippe Laurent, (who recruited Gilles Fahy for singing).

Musical career
They emerged on the European dance scene in 2001 with a hit single "So I Begin" song in English. The single was released by Sony Music/Radikal Records and sold 400,000 copies, peaking at number 36 in the UK Singles Chart Also noteworthy is the accompanying music video featuring the model Jitka Ogurekova. After the initial success another two singles ensued ("I Believe", November 2001, "One Sign", June 2002 and "The Way", July 2002), followed by an album, called after band's name, Galleon by the end of 2002.

Discography

Albums

Singles

References

Musical groups established in 2001
French Eurodance groups
Musical groups from Marseille
Nu-disco musicians